Rock & Roll Strategy is the eighth studio album by the southern rock band 38 Special, released in 1988, and their final album for long-time label A&M Records. It was the first album to feature new vocalist and keyboard player Max Carl. The album contained the group's last top 10 hit, "Second Chance", which peaked at No. 6 on the Billboard Hot 100 singles chart.

Track listing
"Rock & Roll Strategy" (Max Carl, Donnie Van Zant) – 4:34
"What's It to Ya?" (Robert White Johnson, Michael Lunn, Van Zant) – 4:30
"Little Sheba" (Carl) – 4:54
"Comin' Down Tonight" (Carl, Jeff Carlisi, Johnson, Van Zant) – 4:26
"Midnight Magic" (Mark Baker, Carlisi, Cal Curtis, Johnson, Van Zant) – 4:21
"Second Chance" (Carl, Carlisi, Curtis) – 5:04
"Hot 'Lanta" (Carl) – 5:42
"Never Be Lonely" (Carl, Danny Chauncey) – 4:39
"Chattahoochee" (Johnson, Lunn, Van Zant) – 4:11
"Innocent Eyes" (Carl, Carlisi, Chauncey) – 4:17
"Love Strikes" (Carlisi, Johnson, Van Zant) – 4:31

Personnel

.38 Special 
 Max Carl – keyboards, vocals
 Donnie Van Zant – vocals
 Jeff Carlisi – guitars, steel guitar
 Danny Chauncey – guitars
 Larry Junstrom – bass
 Jack Grondin – drums

Additional musicians 
 James Stroud – Synclavier programming, LinnDrum programming
 Robert White Johnson – percussion, backing vocals
 Edd Miller – percussion, vibraslap
 The Noise Gator – horns
 The Six Groomers (the band) – backing vocals

Production 
 Rodney Mills – producer, engineer, mixing 
 Edd Miller – engineer, mixing 
 Thom "TK" Kidd – mix assistant 
 Bob Ludwig – mastering 
 Mark Rogers – production coordination
 Norman Moore – art direction, design 
 Chris Cuffaro – photography

Studios
 Recorded at Soundscape Studios (Atlanta, Georgia).
 Mixed at Cheshire Recording Studios (Atlanta, Georgia).
 Mastered at Masterdisk (New York City, New York).

Charts

Singles

References 

38 Special (band) albums
1988 albums
A&M Records albums
Albums produced by Rodney Mills